The 2019 State of Origin series was the 38th annual best-of-three series between the Queensland and New South Wales rugby league teams. Before this series, Queensland had won 21 times, NSW 14 times, with two series drawn.

For just the second time, a game was played away from Sydney, Brisbane or Melbourne, with Game 2 played at Perth’s Optus Stadium.

Game I

Game II

Game III

Player Debuts

Game 1 

  Cap no. 281, Nick Cotric
  Cap no. 282, Cody Walker
  Cap no. 283, Payne Haas
  Cap no. 284, Cameron Murray
  Cap no. 285, Jack Wighton
  Cap no. 198, Moses Mbye
  Cap no. 199, Joe Ofahengaue
  Cap no. 200, David Fifita

Game 2 

  Cap no. 286, Daniel Saifiti
  Cap no. 287, Dale Finucane

Game 3 

  Cap no. 201, Corey Norman
  Cap no. 202, Christian Welch
  Cap no. 203, Ethan Lowe

Residents 

Source(s):

Under 20s

Under 18s 
The Under-18s State of Origin match was played as a curtain raiser to Game I of State of Origin 2019.
Source(s):

Universities Interstate Challenge 

Source(s):

Women's State of Origin

References 

2019 in Australian rugby league
State of Origin series